The National Lottery is operated by ITHUBA Holdings, to whom the licence was granted in 2015. The lottery is regulated by the National Lottery Commission, and was established in 2000.

Lottery tickets may be bought only by people of at least 18 years of age.

In the 2007 fiscal year transaction values totalled R3.972 billion, with an average of five million transactions per week. In the 2012 National lottery generated R4.7 billion in sales of Lotto and Powerball tickets.

Lotto is the most popular type of gambling in South Africa but Powerball has been the faster-growing for last years due to its high payouts.

History
The National Lottery was introduced to South Africa on 11 March 2000. At the time it was run by Uthingo.

After a marketing effort that aimed to reach 80 percent of South African homes directly
more than 800,000 tickets were sold in the first day of availability
Nearly R70 million worth of tickets were sold in the first three weeks of operation.

In October 2002 operator Uthingo suggested a daily lottery to supplement the weekly draw. The concept, called Keno, was rejected by the trade and industry ministry in March 2003.
In November 2003 the Lotto Plus game was launched, acting as a supplementary weekly lottery available on the purchase of a primary lottery ticket, with an entry fee of R1.

In July 2006 the Gidani consortium, featuring Greek company Intralot as a technical partner, was judged the preferred bidder to operate the lottery for seven years starting April 2007. The operating licence was awarded in October 2006.
In March 2007 the Pretoria High Court set aside that award on application by incumbent Uthingo, finding that the failure to adequately investigate the shareholders in some bidding consortia left room for conflicts of interest.

Following the final draw by incumbent Uthingo, the lottery was indefinitely suspended in April 2007.

In September the operating licence was awarded to Gidani again. 
When ticket sales re-opened in October more than 200,000 tickets were sold within the first three hours. Gidani introduced scratch cards, but they were discontinued for several months when they lost their licence to Ithuba.

In 2015, Lotto licences were awarded to ITHUBA. In 2015, 2 new games were introduced by Ithuba: EAZiWIN, an instant win game consisting of four types of indigenous inspired games; Morabaraba, Fafi Fortune, 4 Siya Wina and Popa Feela and PowerBall Plus.

In December 2020 the lottery draw the unusual final number sequence "5", "6","7", "8" and "9" with a powerball number of "10". This caused controversy with members of the public accusing the lottery of corruption or collusion with the 20 winners.

Eligibility
 Players must be 18 years or older
 Tickets may be bought in person at approved retailers, handheld partners and participating banks in South Africa.
 Online purchase of tickets are only available to people who have an ABSA, FNB, Nedbank and Standard Bank account or have registered on the South African National Lottery website and are residents of South Africa with a South African ID.

Games

8 games operate under the South African National Lottery brand:

LOTTO

Players buy tickets with their choice of six different numbers between 1 and 52; there is provision for random numbers to be generated automatically for those who do not wish to choose, known as Quick Pick.

When introduced, the LOTTO jackpot draw required numbers from 1 to 49. Ithuba Holdings increased the number from 49 to 52 on 30 July 2017.

In the draw, six numbered balls are drawn without replacement from a set of 52 balls numbered from 1 to 52. A further Bonus Ball is also drawn, which affects only players who match five numbers.

Prizes are awarded to players who match at least three of the six drawn numbers, with prizes increasing for matching more of the drawn numbers. All players who match all six drawn numbers win equal shares of the jackpot; the chance of doing so is 1 in 20,358,520. If four, five, or six balls are matched, the relevant prize is divided equally between all who match that many balls. If no player matches all six numbers, the jackpot is added to that of the next Lotto draw—a Rollover.

The entry fee to the LOTTO draw is set at R5.00 per board.

The draw is conducted on Wednesdays and Saturdays on SABC 2 at 20:56 Central Africa Time (CAT).

LOTTO PLUS 1

LOTTO PLUS 1 is exactly the same as LOTTO, but gives the player a second chance to win. When buying a LOTTO ticket, the player must pay an extra R2.50 per board to enter the LOTTO PLUS 1 draw. Odds are the same, while prizes are usually slightly lower.

LOTTO PLUS was introduced on 26 November 2003.

The draw is conducted on Wednesdays and Saturdays on SABC 2 at 20:56 Central Africa Time (CAT).

LOTTO PLUS 2

LOTTO PLUS 2 is exactly the same as LOTTO, but gives the player a third chance to win. When buying a LOTTO ticket, the player must pay an extra R2.50 per board to enter the LOTTO PLUS 2 draw. Odds are the same, while prizes are usually slightly lower.

LOTTO PLUS 2 was introduced on 30 July 2017.

The draw is conducted on Wednesdays and Saturdays on SABC 2 at 20:56 Central Africa Time (CAT).

PowerBall

When introduced, the PowerBall jackpot draw required players to pick five main numbers from 1 to 45 and one 'PowerBall' number from 1 to 20 for an entry fee of R5 per board. Prizes may be won by matching the main numbers, with matches of the PowerBall number winning higher prizes. The top prize of the game is won by matching all five main numbers as well as the PowerBall. Draws take place on Tuesdays and Fridays on Mzansi Magic (DSTV Channel 161) and NewzRoom Afrika (DSTV Channel 405) at 20:58 Central Africa Time (CAT).

After 28 November 2015, odds were changed as more possibilities to win were introduced. Players matching only the Powerball would win money, while before, that ticket would not win anything. In addition, the number of main balls was raised from 45 to 50.

The record prize for any Lottery game in South Africa was in PowerBall at R102,016,595. This prize was won in the Free State but never collected. The highest claimed prize was also from PowerBall at R91,068,427

PowerBall PLUS

PowerBall PLUS is exactly the same as PowerBall, but gives the player a second chance to win. When buying a PowerBall ticket, the player must pay an extra R2.50 per board to enter the PowerBall PLUS draw. Odds are the same, while prizes are usually slightly lower. It was introduced on 28 November 2015 by the National Lottery of South Africa.

Draws take place on Tuesdays and Fridays on Mzansi Magic (DSTV Channel 161) and NewzRoom Afrika (DSTV Channel 405) at 20:58 Central Africa Time (CAT).

Daily LOTTO 
Players buy tickets with their choice of five different numbers between 1 and 36; Numbers can be selected using a manual or QuickPick selection method at a cost of R3 per board.

There are four prize pools for matching 2, 3, 4 or 5 numbers correctly and if nobody matches 5 balls in a draw, the jackpot rolls down to matching 4 numbers.

The Daily LOTTO was introduced on 10 March 2019 and draws take place every night at 21:00 Central Africa Time (CAT), every single day except Christmas Day.

SPORTSTAKE 13

A player can play SPORTSTAKE 13 by predicting outcomes of 13 predetermined match fixtures drawn from English and other identified professional soccer fixtures.

For each fixture the player chooses their prediction by marking on the bet slip;

[1] – for a home win

[x] – for a draw

[2] – for a home loss (Away win)

 You can select a single or multiple outcomes result for each fixture.
 A valid wager must consist of at least one selection per fixture.
 A minimum price per wager per board is R2.00 vat incl, and a maximum wager per Betslip is R2000.00
 Each wager will cost you R2.00 vat incl.
 You can play PROPICK™ as a quick play option
 There is no Multi Draw option.
 SPORTSTAKE 13 fixture results are considered as the final score after 90 minutes of play or after extra time where applicable, however excludes penalty shoot-out.

EAZiWIN

As well as tickets for the Draw Games, the National Lottery also sells instant win digital scratch cards.

They are digital scratch cards, where a card is compared against a slip and not scratched like traditional scratchcards. These are called 'EAZiWIN and are based on traditional African games.

Cards range from R3 to R5.

Discontinued games.
These are the games that The National Lottery offered as over the years but there are no more sales for the games that we missed over the years:

Wina Manje 
Wina Manje was a scratchcard game that consisted of many types of scratch cards. This was replaced by EAZiWIN in 2015.

Raffle 
South African National Lottery announced that there would be a once-off raffle for Christmas 2016. The draw took place on 30 December 2016. It was officially named "Raffle". Prizes included R1,000, R10,000, R100,000, with the top prize being a Mercedes Benz C200 Cabriolet

PICK 3
This game launched on 3 December 2016. It was a daily game with a top prize of R10,000.

The PICK 3 game was discontinued from 15 March 2019.
One can still view the past results of the game until discontinuance, but no further plays can be made for this game mode.

PICK 3 was effectively replaced by the DAILY LOTTO game.

Other ways to play
As well as by purchasing a ticket at a shop, tickets can be purchased many other ways.

Online
All National Lottery games can be played online after registering.  There are two ways of playing the lotto online.

FNB, Standard Bank & Nedbank: LOTTO, LOTTO PLUS 1, LOTTO PLUS 2, PowerBall, PowerBall PLUS and Daily LOTTO are available for play through the bank's apps.

National Lottery website: LOTTO, LOTTO PLUS 1, LOTTO PLUS 2, PowerBall, PowerBall PLUS, Daily Lotto and SPORTSTAKE 13 are available for play through the South African National lottery website.

Record jackpots 
Below lists the highest 11 jackpots from the National Lottery of South Africa.

Operators

Socio-economic impact 
In June 2003 it was reported that 27 percent of lottery players were unemployed
and that 43 percent of players earned less than R2,000 a month.
It was also reported that legalised gambling had created 50 673 jobs in 2000, although it may have redirected spendings from other industries.

2006 research found that 82 percent of South Africans played the lottery once a week and that 53 percent of the population did not engage in any other form of gambling. The average player spent R81 per month on the lottery.

Revenue distribution
Under the current operator, Ithuba, 34 percent of revenue is paid to a central charitable distribution fund, up from an initial 28 percent.
Six percent of revenue is paid as retail commission, ten percent is retained as operational costs and 48 percent is paid in prizes.

Controversy 
In 2020 it was reported by GroundUp that people close to senior executives of the National Lottery, including its chairperson Alfred Nevhutanda, had improperly benefited from the charitable distribution fund. The National Lottery responded by initiating criminal charges against the news organisation and a journalist if the stories were not retracted which the National Lottery lost. The stories of corruption and improper benefit resulted in a government investigation of the National Lottery.

Previous lotteries in South Africa
The now-defunct homeland of Ciskei established a lottery in 1984 and operated by Score-A-Lot. In 1991 Score-A-Lot was the first Lottery in Africa to operate Video Lottery Terminals (VLT) in Africa and the first totally cashless operation using smart card technology. After lengthy negotiations with South Africans "Department of Trade and Industry" (DTI) Score-A-Lot closed in Dec 2001

A lottery was established by decree in the former homeland of Transkei in 1989 and operated by Score-A-Lot. In 1991 Score-A-Lot was the first Lottery in Africa to operate Video Lottery Terminals (VLT) in Africa and the first totally cashless operation using smart card technology. After lengthy negotiations with South Africans "Department of Trade and Industry" (DTI) Score-A-Lot closed in Dec 2001

The Natal Lotto (also referred to as the KZN Lotto) was launched in the KwaZulu-Natal province in 1992.
During eight years of operation it raised R869 million and paid R345 million to charities and R448 million in prize money.

See also
 Uthingo

References

External links
 National Lotteries Board
 UK 49's Lunchtime Result

Lotteries by country
South African culture
Government of South Africa
Gambling in South Africa